We Have Never Been Modern is a 1991 book by Bruno Latour, originally published in French as Nous n'avons jamais été modernes: Essai d'anthropologie symétrique (English translation: 1993).

Content
The book is an "anthropology of science" that explores the dualistic distinction modernity makes between nature and society. Pre-modern peoples, argues Latour, made no such division. Contemporary matters of public concern such as global warming, the HIV/AIDS pandemic and emerging biotechnologies mix politics, science, popular and specialist discourse to such a degree that a tidy nature/culture dualism is no longer possible. This inconsistency has given rise to post-modern and anti-modern movements. Latour attempts to reconnect the social and natural worlds by arguing that the modernist distinction between nature and culture never existed.  In other words, it would be more useful to consider ourselves "amodern" or "nonmodern". He claims we must rework our thinking to conceive of a "Parliament of Things" wherein natural phenomena, social phenomena and the discourse about them are not seen as separate objects to be studied by specialists, but as hybrids made and scrutinized by the public interaction of people, things and concepts."Latour speaks of modern and non-modern constitutions, each with four “guarantees”. There is also an implicit notion of a pre-modern constitution as well, though its less codified conventions would not amount to guarantees. Each of his constitutions addresses four, so to speak, ontological realms: the subject, the object, language and being. The realm of the subject is also that of society, communities, culture and the state; the realm of the object is that of things, technologies, facts and nature; the realm of language includes practices of discourse, mediation, translation, delegation and representation; and, finally, the realm of being includes God and the gods, the immortals, the totemized ancestors – it includes questions of existence. For Latour every epoch’s constitution must have conventions and guarantees in these four ontological realms.
The four guarantees of the modern constitution for Latour are: (a) that nature (i.e. things, objects) is “transcendent”, or universal in time and space; there to be discovered; (b) that society (the subject, the state) is “immanent”, i.e. it is continually constructed “artificially” by citizens or by subjects; (c) that “translation networks” between these first two realms are “banned”, i.e. the “separation of powers” of these realms is “assured”; (d) that a “crossed out God” acts as “arbitrator” of this dualism."

Influence and misrepresentation 
Speculative realist Graham Harman points out that Latour has been misrepresented by some as a postmodernist. Harman cites  We Have Never Been Modern as crucial to understanding Latour's conceptualisation of the "postmoderns as moderns a minus sign added"  and therefore dismisses accusations of Latour as a postmodernist. Harman goes on to be influenced by We Have Never Been Modern adding that postmodernism continues to be subject-centric/anthropocentric (as modernity did) in its distinction of the subject from the object. This forms the basis for Harman's object-oriented ontology.

See also
Gilbert Durand's anthropological trajectory
Science in Action
Politics of Nature 
Laboratory Life (With Steve Woolgar)

References

Sociology of scientific knowledge
Actor-network theory
Science and technology studies works
Anthropology books
Modernism
Harvard University Press books
Works by Bruno Latour
1991 non-fiction books